MO Béjaïa, an Algerian professional association football club, has gained entry to Confederation of African Football (CAF) competitions on several occasions. They have represented Algeria in the Champions League on one occasions, and the Confederation Cup on one occasions.

History
MO Béjaïa whose team has regularly taken part in Confederation of African Football (CAF) competitions. Qualification for Algerian clubs is determined by a team's performance in its domestic league and cup competitions, MO Béjaïa have regularly qualified for the primary African competition, the African Cup, by winning the Ligue Professionnelle 1 or Runners–up. MO Béjaïa have also achieved African qualification via the Algerian Cup and have played in the CAF Confederation Cup. After the Algerian Ligue Professionnelle 1 runner-up in the 2014–15 season and winning the Algerian Cup. Within the participation for the first time in a continental competition in the CAF Champions League, The first match was against Ashanti Gold and ended in defeat with a single goal, and against the same club in the second leg, MO Béjaïa won his first victory and the first goal was own goal scored by Hudu Yakubu and by a player from MO Béjaïa Sofiane Khadir and the match ended with a score of 3–1 and qualified for the next round. The team's march was stopped in the second round after losing against Zamalek with 3–1 on aggregate. Then they moved to the CAF Confederation Cup where MO Béjaïa faced the Tunisian giant Espérance de Tunis in the Play-off round and they won. to qualify for the group stage and putting him in group A with Young Africans, Medeama and TP Mazembe where MO Béjaïa ranked second to face in the semi-final FUS Rabat and after the two matches ended with a draw MO Béjaïa qualified for the final for the first time according to Away goals rule. Where did face TP Mazembe who with his experience won the final with 5–2 on aggregate.

CAF competitions

Statistics

By season
Information correct as of 6 November 2016.
Key

Pld = Played
W = Games won
D = Games drawn
L = Games lost
F = Goals for
A = Goals against
Grp = Group stage

PR = Preliminary round
R1 = First round
R2 = Second round
SR16 = Second Round of 16
R16 = Round of 16
QF = Quarter-final
SF = Semi-final

Key to colours and symbols:

By competition

In Africa
:

Finals
Matches won after regular time (90 minutes of play), extra-time (aet) or a penalty shootout (p) are highlighted in green, while losses are highlighted in red.

Statistics by country
Statistics correct as of game against TP Mazembe on November 6, 2016

CAF competitions

African competitions goals
Statistics correct as of game against TP Mazembe on November 6, 2016

List of All-time appearances
This List of All-time appearances for MO Béjaïa in African competitions contains football players who have played for MO Béjaïa in African football competitions and have managed to accrue 10 or more appearances. As well as participating in UAFA Club Championship for those who have exceeded the limit of 10 African matches only.

Gold Still playing competitive football in MO Béjaïa.

African opponents by cities

Notes

References

Africa
MO Béjaïa